Ustlawn (Squamish language: Eslhá7an) is a Squamish village community located on the shores of North Vancouver. The Squamish name Eslhá7an translates as head bay, denoted what used to be the farthest out reaching bay enclave in the Burrard Inlet. Its origin as a primary village goes back to the earliest missionaries in British Columbia with the St. Paul's Catholic Church being the oldest extant church in British Columbia , and a National Historic Site of Canada. It is also home to the Eslha7an Training Center, the Stitsma Employment Center, and the So-Sah-Latch Health and Family Centre. On the shores of the village is the Mosquito Creek Marina. The official name of the Indian reserve it is situated on is Mission Indian Reserve No. 1.

See also
List of Squamish villages

References

Bibliography
 Barman, Jean (2007) [2005]. Stanley Park's Secret: The Forgotten Families of Whoi Whoi, Kanaka Ranch and Brockton Point. Madeira Park, BC: Harbour Publishing. .

External links
Squamish Nation
Stitsma Employment Center
Squamish Nation Marine Group
The Creek Marina & Boatyard

Indian reserves in the Lower Mainland
Squamish villages